The discography of American rapper Future consists of nine studio albums, one compilation album, one collaborative album, 24 mixtapes, two extended plays, and 117 singles (including 61 as a featured artist).

On October 19, 2018, Future released a collaborative mixtape with Juice Wrld, Wrld on Drugs. The album debuted and peaked at number two on the Billboard 200. It produced the top-40 single, "Fine China", which debuted and peaked at number 26 on the Hot 100.

On January 18, 2019, Future released his seventh studio album, The Wizrd. The album debuted and peaked atop the Billboard 200. On June 7, 2019, Future released his debut extended play, Save Me. The EP debuted and peaked at number five on the Billboard 200.

On May 15, 2020, Future released his eighth studio album, High Off Life. The album debuted and peaked atop the Billboard 200. It produced the top-10 single, "Life Is Good", which features Drake and reached number two on the Billboard Hot 100. It also produced the top-40 single, "Trillionaire", which features YoungBoy Never Broke Again and debuted and peaked at number 34 on the Hot 100. On November 13, 2020, Future released a collaborative album with Lil Uzi Vert, Pluto x Baby Pluto. The album debuted and peaked at number two on the Billboard 200.  In 2021, Future was featured alongside Young Thug on Drake's single, "Way 2 Sexy", which became his first number-one single. That same year, he released a collaboration with Gunna, "Too Easy", which reached number 16 on the Hot 100.

On April 29, 2022, Future released his ninth studio album, I Never Liked You. The album debuted and peaked atop the Billboard 200. It produced his second number-one single, "Wait for U", which features Drake and Tems, and also became his second song to debut at the top of the Hot 100 and his second collaboration with Drake to reach the top, following "Way 2 Sexy" in 2021. The number-one debuts of both the album and "Wait for U" made Future the seventh artist to simultaneously debut a song and album at the top of their respective charts. The album also produced the top-20 singles, "Love You Better" (charted at number 12), "Keep It Burnin", which features Kanye West (charted at number 15), and the top-40 single, "Worst Day" (charted at number 34).

Albums

Studio albums

Collaborative albums

Reissued albums

Mixtapes

Collaborative mixtapes

Extended plays

Singles

As lead artist

As featured artist

Promotional singles

Other charted and certified songs

Other guest appearances

Production discography

Music videos

As lead artist

As featured artist

Notes

References

External links 
 Official website
 Future at AllMusic
 
 

Discographies of American artists
Hip hop discographies
Production discographies